Siphonolaimidae is a family of nematodes belonging to the order Monhysterida.

Genera:
 Astomonema Ott, Rieger, Rieger & Enderes, 1982
 Cyartonema
 Parastomonema Kito, 1989
 Paraterschellingia
 Siphonolaimus de Man, 1893
 Solenolaimus Cobb, 1893
 Southernia

References

Nematodes